Cirque Mountain is a  mountain summit located in the Glacier Peak Wilderness of the North Cascades in Washington state. The mountain is situated on the crest of the Cascade Range, on the shared border of Snohomish County and Chelan County, also straddling the boundary between the Mount Baker-Snoqualmie National Forest and the Wenatchee National Forest. Its nearest higher peak is Napeequa Peak,  to the south. The peak is set on Chiwawa Ridge with Napeequa, and other notable peaks on this ridge include Fortress Mountain, Buck Mountain, Brahma Peak, Mount Berge, and Chiwawa Mountain. This mountain has small, unnamed, hanging glaciers in cirques surrounding the summit. Precipitation runoff from the peak and meltwater from the glaciers drains east to the headwaters of Napeequa River; or west into the Suiattle River.

Geology

The North Cascades features some of the most rugged topography in the Cascade Range with craggy peaks, ridges, and deep glacial valleys. Geological events occurring many years ago created the diverse topography and drastic elevation changes over the Cascade Range leading to various climate differences.

The history of the formation of the Cascade Mountains dates back millions of years ago to the late Eocene Epoch. With the North American Plate overriding the Pacific Plate, episodes of volcanic igneous activity persisted. In addition, small fragments of the oceanic and continental lithosphere called terranes created the North Cascades about 50 million years ago. During the Pleistocene period dating back over two million years ago, glaciation advancing and retreating repeatedly scoured and shaped the landscape. Uplift and faulting in combination with glaciation have been the dominant processes which have created the tall peaks and deep valleys of the North Cascades area.

Extensive volcanic activity began to take place in the oligocene, about 35 million years ago. Due to Glacier Peak's proximity to Cirque Mountain, volcanic ash is common in the area.

Climate
Cirque Mountain is located in the marine west coast climate zone of western North America. Most weather fronts originate in the Pacific Ocean, and travel northeast toward the Cascade Mountains. As fronts approach the North Cascades, they are forced upward by the peaks of the Cascade Range, causing them to drop their moisture in the form of rain or snowfall onto the Cascades (Orographic lift). As a result, the west side of the North Cascades experiences high precipitation, especially during the winter months in the form of snowfall. During winter months, weather is usually cloudy, but, due to high pressure systems over the Pacific Ocean that intensify during summer months, there is often little or no cloud cover during the summer. Because of maritime influence, snow tends to be wet and heavy, resulting in high avalanche danger.

See also

 Geography of the North Cascades
 List of Highest Mountain Peaks in Washington

References

External links
 Weather forecast:   National Weather Service
 Napeequa, Cirque, and Glacier Peaks: PBase aerial photo

Mountains of Washington (state)
Mountains of Chelan County, Washington
Mountains of Snohomish County, Washington
Cascade Range
North Cascades
North American 2000 m summits